Rafael Spottorno Díaz-Caro (born 28 February 1945), is a Spanish diplomat, Head of the Spanish Royal Household between 2011 and 2014. Since 2014, is involved in the corruption scandal named Tarjetas Black.

Spottorno has a degree in Law and has been consul in Havana and Rio de Janeiro, cultural advisor of Spain in Brussels (1974-1977), director of Political Affairs of Eastern Europe (1979), permanent representative of Spain in the Council of the NATO (1982-1983) and representative at the UN (1986). He was also the chief of staff of the Ministry of Foreign Affairs of Francisco Fernández Ordóñez and Javier Solana.

On 20 September 2011, he was appointed Head of the House of the King to replace Alberto Aza Arias;  previously, he had served as General Secretary of the Casa del Rey from 1993 to 2002.

On the private side, he has been director of the Caja Madrid Foundation, holding this position from September 2002 to March 2011.

In September 2014, his involvement in the use of illegal cards of Caja Madrid, known as the case of black cards, was discovered; before the trial began, he returned 11.953 euros when he spent 235,818 euros unduly. He declared before Audiencia Nacional on 5 October 2016. On 7 October 2014, he resigned as private adviser to Felipe VI due to that scandal. On 13 June 2017, he was imputed again after a judge decided to file the case. On 23 February 2017 he was sentenced to two and a half years in prison and a fine of €4,200.

References

1945 births
Living people
Spanish diplomats
People from Madrid
Knights Grand Cross of the Order of Isabella the Catholic
Recipients of the Order of Isabella the Catholic
Grand Crosses of the Order of the Sun of Peru
Complutense University of Madrid alumni